MCRC may refer to:
 metastatic colorectal cancer
 Manchester Cancer Research Centre, England
 Mass Communication Research Centre, at the Jamia Millia Islamia university, in Delhi, India
 Middlebury College Rugby Club, rugby union club in Vermont, United States
 Marine Corps Recruiting Command